Gel-e Sefid (also Romanized as Gel-e Sefīd, Gelsafīd, and Gel Sefīd; also known as Gul-i-Safīd) is a village in Gel-e Sefid Rural District, in the Central District of Langarud County, Gilan Province, Iran. At the 2006 census, its population was 920, in 316 families.

References 

Populated places in Langarud County